Fredrik Sundin (born June 4, 1981) is a professional Swedish ice hockey player.

Career 
Sundin Stavanger Oilers in the Norwegian GET-ligaen. He has played with Stavanger since 2005. Before signing with Stavanger had he played in Swedish Elite League for Färjestads BK and Timrå IK.  He has also represented Bofors IK in the Allsvenskan. In 2002 he won the Swedish Championship while playing for Färjestads BK.

He represented Sweden in the World Junior Ice Hockey Championships in 2001.

External links

1981 births
Living people
Swedish ice hockey forwards
Färjestad BK players
Timrå IK players
Stavanger Oilers players
Swedish expatriate ice hockey players in Norway